Dominican University of California is a private university in San Rafael, California. It was founded in 1890 as Dominican College by the Dominican Sisters of San Rafael. It is one of the oldest universities in California.

Dominican is accredited by the Western Association of Schools and Colleges (WASC). More than 60 academic majors, minors and concentrations, including 11 graduate programs are offered with an average class size of 16. In fall 2020, Dominican had 1374 undergraduate students, including 354 transfer students. Ninety-one percent of students are from California, 6% are from other states and 3% from other nations. In fall 2020, 100% of incoming first-year students received financial aid, 68% identify as ethnically diverse and 23% are the first in their family to attend college. In 2019, Dominican University of California introduced a Test-Optional Policy, allowing first-year students applying for admission to have the option to submit SAT or ACT scores, beginning with the fall 2020 cohort.

The university is a member of NCAA Division II and competes in the Pacific West Conference.

History

Early history 
The history of Dominican University of California can be traced back to 1850. It was in this year that Joseph Sadoc Alemany was appointed Bishop of Monterey. At the time of this appointment, he was in Italy attending a meeting of the Dominican Order, a Roman Catholic religious order founded by Saint Dominic de Guzmán in France in 1216.

As Bishop Alemany was returning to his new post in California, he stopped in Paris at the Dominican Monastery of the Cross and expressed his desire to have a few Dominican Sisters join him to teach the children of the Forty-niners. A Belgian novice, Sister Mary of the Cross Goemaere (1809-1891) volunteered to accompany the new bishop and to begin a school in his new diocese. Within three years, nine women (three American, one Mexican, and five Spanish) joined Sister Mary to form the Congregation of the Most Holy Name. In 1854, the Dominicans moved to Benicia.

Following the leadership of Mother Mary Goemaere, Mother Louis O'Donnell (1887-1929) moved the motherhouse, a school and novitiate from Benicia to San Rafael in 1889.

In 1890 the Congregation of the Most Holy Name, under the auspices of Mother O'Donnell, filed Articles of Incorporation with the Secretary of State of California. With the encouragement of faculty of the University of California in Berkeley, a junior college was opened in 1915, and in 1917 a four-year college, Dominican College, was formed. At that point Dominican College became the first Catholic college in California to grant the bachelor's degree to women. Originally a female-only institution, Dominican College became coeducational in 1971.

Campus

It is situated in a residential neighborhood at the base of San Pedro Mountain. The gardens of the university are a combination of four former family estates and contain over 100 species of trees. A seasonal creek flows east to west through the middle of campus.

Residence halls
Almost 90% of freshmen live on-campus. Freshmen are automatically guaranteed a residency on campus while sophomores, juniors and seniors receive on-campus housing through a lottery. All residence halls are co-ed with gender specific bathrooms. Each hall has a resident advisor who oversees the students.

Points of interest

Ansel Adams Collection
In the 1980s, an alumna remembered that she had her picture taken when she was a student at the college in the 1950s. She went in search of the print. While she didn't find her photograph, nearly 100 original Ansel Adams photographs were discovered scattered across campus. These photographs, taken by the not-yet-famous Adams between 1932 and 1952, are part of the Dominican private collection.

Della Robia Collection
Enameled terra-cotta sculptures grace the entryways to Meadowlands Hall, Guzman Hall, Archbishop Alemany Library and Caleruega Hall. These terra-cotta sculptures have been made for centuries by the Della Robia family, a famous Florentine family of sculptors and ceramicists which started with Luca della Robbia.

Forest Meadows Amphitheater

Forest Meadows Amphitheater is an amphitheater on Dominican's Campus. While it used to hold the university's Commencement ceremonies, the amphitheater is now used by the Marin Shakespeare Company during the Shakespeare Festival in the fall. The company has been using the amphitheater since 1967.

Academics
Dominican focuses on interdisciplinary studies. In the sciences, the university involves undergraduates in sophisticated research projects, and encourages students to present at national academic conferences and publish in peer-reviewed journals. In the humanities, students can combine dance and musical performance with the study of philosophy, literature, world cultures, and religion. Dominican also offers undergraduate and graduate programs in business, education, counseling psychology, occupational therapy and nursing. It follows a semester system: Fall (August–December) and Spring (January–May). Classes are also offered in the summer.

Partnership with Make School
In 2018, Dominican University of California and San Francisco-based Make School submitted an application to the WASC Senior College and University Commission (WSCUC) to enter an incubation relationship. The partnership enabled Dominican to offer a minor in Computer Science and Make School to offer an accelerated bachelor's degree in Applied Computer Science (ACS) under Dominican's oversight. In 2021, Dominican assumed direct delivery of the ACS program.

Schools/departments
The university is organized into three schools with the following departments:

School of Liberal Arts and Education
 Art, Art History, Media and Design
 Education Studies
 Literature, Language and Humanities
 Music, Dance and Performing Arts
 Psychology
 Public Affairs

Barowsky School of Business
 Business

School of Health and Natural Sciences
 Counseling Psychology
 Natural Sciences and Mathematics
 Nursing
 Occupational Therapy
 Physician Assistant
 Public Health

Accreditation
The university is accredited by the WASC Senior College and University Commission. Specific programs are accredited by specialized accreditors:
 Occupational Therapy: American Occupational Therapy Association, Inc.
 Nursing: Commission on Collegiate Nursing Education (CCNE), State of California Board of Registered Nursing
 Teacher Education: State of California Commission on Teacher Credentialing

Organization and administration
Dominican is a non-profit organization governed by a privately appointed board of trustees along with the university president, provost, vice-presidents and deans. The board currently has 30 voting members who serve three three-year terms and meet four times annually. The trustees elect a president to serve as the general manager and chief executive of the university. Dr. Nicola Pitchford was appointed the tenth president of the university in July 2021.

Student government
The Associated Students of Dominican University (ASDU) is the student government for Dominican and helps students plan and provide campus activities, distribute activity funds, initiate changes in policy, and represent themselves to the university's administration and the broader community. This group of elected student representatives serves both as the student activities association and the student government board. The members of the ASDU Senate are composed of representatives from all four class levels of regular day program students.

Student life

Traditions

Shield Ceremony

Each fall, the university holds a Shield Ceremony, a tradition that started in the 12th century when Saint Dominic Guzman created the Dominican order. It now continues every fall during Convocation, when the Dominican seniors officially greet the incoming freshmen with a special gift: an illustration of a shield that reflects an inspirational motto. The motto, written by the seniors, is intended to help guide the freshmen throughout their college years and beyond. Four years later at Commencement, a hand-crafted wood carving of the illustrated shield is presented to the graduating class. All of Dominican's shields, dating back to the early 1920s, are displayed on campus in the Meadowlands Residence Hall, Guzman Lecture Hall and the Shield Room.

Convocation/Family Weekend (formerly Spirit Week)
Once a year, Dominican invites all students and their families for a celebration of the university and its students. It opens with Convocation, a celebration of the academic achievements of Dominican students. Throughout the celebration, all are invited to explore the campus, attend special classes, meet with the President and faculty and cheer on the Dominican Penguins at competitive games. Family Weekend concludes on Sunday with an athletic scrimmage and tailgate party.

Senior Thesis
Most academic departments at Dominican require a senior thesis/project, a one-year culminating experience that offers evidence of accomplishment in a discipline or area of inquiry. Like a master's thesis, the senior thesis gives students an opportunity as undergraduates, to explore in-depth issues that interest them. The major determines the nature of the thesis/project, which can take many forms: a research document, a novel, a business plan, a portfolio of poetry, or original works of art.

Baccalaureate Mass and Commencement
Held the day prior to Commencement, Baccalaureate Mass is a unique tradition that reflects Dominican's Catholic heritage. The Mass, planned and led by members of the graduating classes, is held at St. Raphael's Church in downtown San Rafael. Students and their families, faculty, staff and friends of the university are invited to attend.

On a Saturday morning in May, the campus community joins graduating students, their families and friends for Commencement. The Dominican tradition includes a procession led by a bagpiper.

Clubs and organizations
There are more than forty student clubs and organizations at Dominican with categories including Athletics, Campus Diversity, Religious, Social and Major-Related.

Athletics

The Dominican athletic teams are called the Penguins. The university is a member of the Division II level of the National Collegiate Athletic Association (NCAA), primarily competing in the Pacific West Conference as a provisional member for most of their sports since the 2009–10 academic year (achieving D-II full member status in 2011–12); while its men's lacrosse team competes in the Western Collegiate Lacrosse League (WCLL) at the Division I level of the Men's Collegiate Lacrosse Association (MCLA). The Penguins previously competed in the California Pacific Conference (Cal Pac) of the National Association of Intercollegiate Athletics (NAIA) from 1996–97 to 2008–09.

Dominican competes in 15 intercollegiate varsity sports: Men's sports include basketball, cross country, lacrosse, golf, soccer and track & field; while women's sports include basketball, cross country, golf, lacrosse, soccer, softball, tennis, track & field and volleyball.

Notable people

 Etel Adnan, Lebanese writer and artist, art department head and philosophy professor, 1952-1972
Melba Beals, journalist, was among the nine African-American teenagers who over 50 years ago advanced the civil rights movement with the integration of Little Rock Central High School in Little Rock, Arkansas. Today, Beals lives in the San Francisco Bay Area, and teaches journalism at Dominican University of California, where she is the chair of the communications department.
 Urso Chappell, graphic designer, writer, and world's fair historian.
 Marion Irvine, "The Flying Nun", broke numerous age-group records in distance running events. 
 Abigail Kinoiki Kekaulike Kawānanakoa, member of the House of Kawānanakoa. She is commonly referred to as a princess despite never officially being granted such a title.
 Killian Larson, American professional basketball player who currently plays in Europe.
 Seán Mac Falls, Irish poet, songwriter, and Literary Arts philanthropist.
 Angela Salinas, first Hispanic female to become a United States Marine Corps general officer.
 Hannah Stocking, American YouTuber, internet personality, and model

See also
 List of colleges and universities in California

References

External links
 Official website
 Official athletics website

 
Buildings and structures in San Rafael, California
Dominican universities and colleges in the United States
Education in San Rafael, California
Educational institutions established in 1890
Liberal arts colleges in California
Schools accredited by the Western Association of Schools and Colleges
Universities and colleges in Marin County, California
Catholic universities and colleges in California
Former women's universities and colleges in the United States
1890 establishments in California